Glynnis Breytenbach (born 9 August 1960) is a former prosecutor for the National Prosecuting Authority (NPA) of South Africa and a Member of Parliament for the Democratic Alliance (DA). She is South Africa's Shadow Minister of Justice. In this capacity, she has called for an end to ongoing political interference that has compromised the integrity of the NPA. Her protracted dispute with the NPA over her suspension in 2012 from its Specialised Commercial Crime Unit was covered extensively in the media. In 2017, she published a memoir, Rule of Law, and in 2018 was shortlisted for the National Director of Public Prosecutions post at the NPA, but later withdrew her candidacy.

Departure from the NPA 
In April 2012, acting National Director of Public Prosecutions Nomgcobo Jiba suspended Breytenbach from her position as a regional head at the NPA's Specialised Commercial Crime Unit (SCCU), on the basis of a complaint laid by a company called Imperial Crown Trading. Breytenbach has claimed that she was suspended because she had pursued the prosecution of Richard Mdluli, former head of the police's Crime Intelligence Division, on fraud and corruption charges. The charges against Mdluli were dropped by Lawrence Mrwebi, the head of the SCCU, a decision which was later found to have been unlawful.

Disciplinary proceedings, which at Breytenbach's request were open to the media, cleared Breytenbach of any wrongdoing in May 2013, a year after she was suspended. In the interim, she had unsuccessfully challenged the suspension at the Public Service Bargaining Council and in court. She was also acquitted of multiple criminal charges relating to documents which she had accidentally deleted from her work computer. However, after unsuccessfully challenging her subsequent transfer out of the SCCU, she resigned from the NPA in January 2014, joined the DA shortly afterwards, and was sworn in as a Member of Parliament that May. In February 2014, she reached a settlement with the NPA on all outstanding labour disputes.

References

Offices held 

Living people
Prosecutors
Democratic Alliance (South Africa) politicians
Members of the National Assembly of South Africa
Place of birth missing (living people)
South African women lawyers
21st-century South African women politicians
21st-century South African politicians
21st-century South African lawyers
Women members of the National Assembly of South Africa
21st-century women lawyers
1960 births